The 1984 Italian Formula Three Championship was the 21st Italian Formula Three Championship. It began on 25 March at Vallelunga and ended on 28 October at Misano after twelve races. The championship was won by the Alessandro Santin from Coloni, who drove a Ralt RT3/83-Alfa Romeo and a RT3/84-Alfa Romeo.

Calendar

All races are held in Italy.

Drivers and teams

Results and standings

Results

Championship standings
Points are awarded as follows:

References

External links
 Official website

Italian Formula Three Championship seasons
Formula Three
1984 in Formula Three